Flat Creek is a  right-bank tributary of the Appomattox River in the U.S. state of Virginia.

The name appears as "Flatt Creek" on some 19th-century sources. Amelia Springs, located next to Flat Creek 2 miles north of Jetersville, was a popular resort in pre-Civil War days, and the site of the Battle of Amelia Springs just days before the end of the war in April 1865. The year before, cavalry led by Union general August Kautz had conducted raids against the Richmond and Danville Railroad, and Confederate defenders clashed with Kautz's forces at the bridge over Flat Creek just north of Chula on May 14.

Tributaries 

Listed in order, beginning at mouth:

See also
List of rivers of Virginia

References

USGS Hydrologic Unit Map - State of Virginia (1974)

Rivers of Virginia
Tributaries of the James River
Rivers of Nottoway County, Virginia
Rivers of Amelia County, Virginia